The Cambric Mask is a 1919 American silent drama film directed by Tom Terriss and starring Alice Joyce and Maurice Costello. It was produced and distributed by the Vitagraph Company of America.

Cast

Preservation
With no prints of The Cambric Mask located in any film archives, it is a lost film.

References

External links

Lantern slide

1919 films
American silent feature films
Lost American films
Films directed by Tom Terriss
Vitagraph Studios films
Films based on works by Robert W. Chambers
American black-and-white films
Silent American drama films
1919 drama films
1919 lost films
Lost drama films
1910s American films